The 2010–2011 Rhode Island Rams men's basketball team represented the University of Rhode Island in the 2010–2011 college basketball season. The team was led by head coach Jim Baron in his tenth season as the head coach. The Rams competed in the Atlantic 10 Conference and played their home games at Ryan Center. Rhode Island ended the season at 20–14 (9–7 A-10 play), and lost in the second round of the Atlantic 10 men's basketball tournament to the eventual Atlantic 10 Tournament Champion, Richmond. They were invited to the 2011 College Basketball Invitational where they advanced to the quarterfinals and lost to UCF.

Roster

Schedule

References

Rhode Island Rams men's basketball seasons
Rhode Island
Rhode Island
Rhode
Rhode